Catfight is term for an altercation between two women.

Catfight may also refer to:
                 
 Catfight (video game), a PC fighting video game
 Catfight (animal behavior)
 Catfight (professional wrestling)
 Catfight (film), a 2016 film directed by Onur Tukel
 Catfight (album), a 2006 album by Hefner
 "Catfight", an episode of Ben 10: Omniverse

See also
 Dogfight (disambiguation)
 Girlfight (disambiguation)
 Tiger versus lion